Patrizio is the third album of Italian baritone Patrizio Buanne. It was released in the United States on September 8, 2009, and in the United Kingdom on April 5, 2010.

While his previous two albums focused on the Italian songbook, his third album was "a much more conventional affair that recalls the contemporary swing-pop output of Michael Bublé."

Track listing

Special Edition
This album was released in four different versions worldwide. Whereas most of the songs are similar, some songs are not available on all editions, such as On The Street Where You Live, a cover of the Melanie C song First Day of My Life, the songs Solo Tu (My Baby), There's Nothing Like This and the original This Kiss Tonight. All songs are available on the Australian Special Edition though.

Charts

Certifications

References

2009 albums
Patrizio Buanne albums